The Death of Rhythm and Blues is an EP by American metalcore band American Standards, released on September 12, 2013.

Release 
"The Engine and the Engineer" was the first single released with an accompanying music video on September 6, 2013.

Track listing

Personnel 
Writing, performance and production credits are adapted from the album liner notes.

American Standards 
 Brandon Kellum – vocals
 Brennen Westermeyer – guitar
 Corey Skowronski – bass
 Geoff Gittleson – drums

Production 
Joe Gerhard – production, mixing
 Michael Gessert – engineering
 Jay Maas – mastering at Getaway Recordings, Boston, MA

Design
 Corey Skowronski – art, design

References

External links 
 American Standards on Youtube
 American Standards on Facebook
 American Standards on Bandcamp

2013 EPs